Colaspis recurva is a species of leaf beetle from North America. It is found in coastal states, its range spanning from Virginia south to Florida west to Louisiana.

References

Further reading

 

Eumolpinae
Articles created by Qbugbot
Taxa named by Doris Holmes Blake
Beetles described in 1974
Beetles of the United States